Klodno may refer to the following places in Poland:
Kłodno, Pomeranian Voivodeship
Kłodno, West Pomeranian Voivodeship
Kłódno, Łódź Voivodeship